Marie-Françoise Bechtel (born 19 March 1976
in Coarraze)
is a senior French civil servant and politician.  Appointed Councillor of State in 1980, she directed the National School of Administration from 2000 to 2002. She was 
deputy for Aisne's 4th constituency in the National Assembly of France
from 2012 to 2017.

Biography
Daughter of Gaston Cassiau (1911-1988), a civil servant in public works, and Marie-Christine Sahorès (1907-1999).
A teacher and school principal,
Bechtel is from Oloron-Sainte-Marie, where she passed her baccalaureate in 1963.

She reads Jean-Paul Sartre, whom she "adores".
After studying philosophy at the University of Paris-Sorbonne - where she became involved in May 68,
she obtained l Agrégation in 1972 and, "follower of the Hegelian dialectic",
taught this discipline at the high schools of Sainte-Foy-la-Grande, Libourne and Chartres for five years.

External Links

 Her page on the site of the National Assembly

References

21st-century French women politicians
Deputies of the 14th National Assembly of the French Fifth Republic
Living people
1946 births